The Lokono or Arawak are an Arawak people native to northern coastal areas of South America. Today, approximately 10,000 Lokono live primarily along the coasts and rivers of Venezuela, Guyana, Suriname, Barbados and French Guiana. They speak the Arawak language, the eponymous language of the Arawakan language family, as well as various Creole languages, and English.

Name

Historically, the group self-identified and still identifies as 'Lokono-Arawak' by the semi fluent speakers in the tribe, or simply as 'Arawak' (by non speakers of the native tongue within the tribe) and strictly as 'Lokono' by tribal members who are still fluent in the language, because in their own language they call themselves 'Lokono' meaning 'many people' (of their particular tribe), with 'Lokobe' meaning 'some people' (of their particular tribe), 'Loko' means 'one person' (of their particular tribe) as well as the name of the language they speak...so one would say 'Da Jiabo Loko' to mean 'I speak the language' (of our tribe), the term 'Arawak' does not exist as a word anywhere in the Lokono language, and instead was given to them by the Warrau tribe of the Orinoco delta who had more frequent contact with the Spaniards of Trinidad since the early 1500s, and the name 'Arawak' was subsequently adopted by all other Europeans in the Caribbean to refer to the Lokono. About 10% or 1,000 of the 10,000 Lokono alive are fluent in their language, all aged 50 and over, with another 10% of varying ages - but mostly 30–50 in age range being semi fluent, and 80% under 30 years of age being unable to speak their native tongue but only able to speak English, Dutch, French or Spanish - as Lokono is not taught in any school system in any country.

In the 19th century, when Western scholars had established that the major indigenous population of the Caribbean during European contact (now known as the [Taíno] were culturally and linguistically related to the South American Lokono-Arawak, ethnologist Daniel Garrison Brinton proposed calling the Caribbean people "Island Arawak". Subsequent scholars shortened this convention to simply "Arawak", thereby causing confusion with the mainland people.

In the 20th century, scholars such as Irving Rouse began using the older term Taíno for the Caribbean peoples to distinguish them from mainlanders. The mainland Arawak call themselves "Lokono" (also spelled "Locono" and "Lokomo"); this has become more common in scholarly literature since the late 20th century.

History
The Arawakan languages may have developed in the Orinoco River Valley, and subsequently spread widely as speakers migrated, becoming the region's most extensive language family by the time of European contact. The group that identified as the Arawak or Lokono settled the coastal and river valley areas of what is now Guyana, Suriname, French Guiana, Barbados and parts of the island of Trinidad.

While the Spanish rapidly colonized the Caribbean islands, the Lokono and other mainland peoples resisted colonization for a much longer period. The Spanish were unable to subdue them throughout the 16th century. However, with increased encroachment from other European powers in the early 17th century, the Lokono allied with Spain against the neighboring Kalina (Caribs), who had allied with the English and Dutch. Subsequently, the Lokono engaged in trading relationships with the Europeans, an arrangement that led to prosperity. However, economic and social changes in the region in the early 19th century, including the end of the plantation economy, adversely affected the Lokono, and their population began to decline.

In the 20th century, the Lokono began to supplement their traditional agricultural economy by selling fish and lumber and through migrant labor, and their population has begun to rise again. There are approximately 10,000 Lokono living in Venezuela, Guyana, Suriname, and French Guiana, as well as thousands of others with Lokono ancestry.

Barbados 
There are 100 Lokono in Barbados, these are all descendants of the same family that can all trace back to the last surviving daughter of one of Guyana's last Lokono Hereditary Chiefs, Amorotahe Haubariria ('Flying Harpy Eagle'), her Lokono name as a girl was Shoko Laliwa (Little Yellow Butterfly) - later given the Christian name Marian Lucky (and later was called Princess Marian by an English Governor in colonial Georgetown Guyana), she emigrated to Barbados from Guyana in 1925 with her Dutch husband and 6 children.

Princess Marian of the Eagle Clan Lokono of Guyana was born in 1879 in the Upper Demerara River Chiefdom (Toh Isauka), 115 miles south of Mackenzie/Linden, where her father  was the last traditional ruler of in Guyana to evade colonization. She had a normal traditional birth and lived a naked childhood in the Jungle Chiefdom until her 12/13th year (after her traditional 9-day long Puberty ritual), she then became the first member of the Eagle Clan Arawak ruling family nobility to become Christianised - and she was given the new English name 'Marian Lucky' by the Anglican Bishop William Austin in 1892 (though she kept her traditional animist spiritually and practiced it in secret, praying with sacred Tobacco for her children's protection - as was observed years later by her youngest daughter Hannah who described it).

Marian's father's Chiefdom was one of only 2 Palisaded Lokono villages ever found in Guyana, from present-day Muritaro village to Malali Village, thence to Great Falls village, thus prompting Marian to tell her children "Guyana became bigger when the English took over our land". Three Eagle Clan Lokono brothers from the general Chiefdom's Lokono population (including Henry Simon and his wife), and who were Christianized and given the surname 'Simon' by Bishop Austin, left the Upper Demerara River Chiefdom in its last years of decline after ravages by various epidemics, and they became the 2nd founding family to create a new Lokono village called Pakuri (St. Cuthbert's Mission), on the Mahaica River, Charles Bernard and his wife from Moraikobai village on the Mahaicony River was the first person to start Pakuri Village in 1882. The 3rd Founding Lokono family of Pakuri was that of Richard Dundas and his wife who also came from Moraikobai.

Marian met a young creole Dutch businessman called Vivian Arnold DeWever in 1899, when he worked as an apprentice trader transporting commercial goods from the Sprawstons company in Mackenzie British Guiana, to her father's Chiefdom to exchange for gold and diamonds that were found in the tribal lands. Vivian fell in love with her at first sight and the couple married, they then moved to Georgetown in 1900 - where they lived on Robb Street in the building that is now the 'Guiding Light Hotel', as upper-class socialites in the colonial business community.

The title of 'Princess' was given to Marian in 1921 by the British Governor of Guiana Sir Wilfred Collet when she was invited with her husband (who then had inherited the ownership of The Argosy newspaper and a reasonable fortune from his successful business entrepreneur father) to a ball that was being held in the Colonial Governments 'Assembly Rooms' in Georgetown, in honor of the Prince of Wales visiting Guyana at the time, and it was the Colonial Governor who introduced Marian to HRH the Prince of Wales as 'Princess Marian of the Arawaks' (because her father was the last Hereditary Chief), and HRH the Prince of Wales had Marian and her husband seated near to him, later dancing with her twice that night, as was recorded in family oral history. That was how Marian acquired the title 'Princess' that she is still affectionately and respectfully accorded to this day because there are no words for 'Prince' or 'Princess' in the Arawak language, son or daughter of the Hereditary Chief.

In 1925, after her husband business in Guyana collapsed and his fortune had been lost, the couple with their 6 surviving children - Vidi Arnold DeWever, David Arnold DeWever, Ruth Della DeWever (who married James Serrao in Barbados), Martha Isabella DeWever (who married William Keith Chandler in Barbados), Hannah Mariah DeWever (who married George Cecil Corbin in Barbados), and Joshua DeWever - all emigrated to Barbados Island in the Caribbean. Marian died of a ruptured appendix in 1928, and she was buried in Westbury cemetery in Bridgetown, where her grave is the only known burial place of a Lokono royal in the Caribbean, and her tombstone is the only one in existence worldwide that is written both in English and the language of the Lokono people. Marian was the last fluent speaker of the Lokono language in the ruling family of the Eagle Clan, however the middle-aged and older rest of the Chiefdom's remnant surviving tribal members on Pakuri have retained the fluency of the language.

Princess Marian's second son David Arnold DeWever attempted to retain the former Demerara Chiefdom lands for his clan in the Law Courts of Guyana in the 1960s but was unsuccessful, he was the last member of the Clan in the diaspora to have contact with the rest of the Tribe in Guyana - until 1992, when Princess Marian's great-grandson Damon Corrie (at age 19) married an Eagle Clan Arawak girl on Pakuri Lokono Autonomous Territory called Shirling Simon (who was 17) - herself a descendant of the Simon brothers from the old Eagle Clan Upper Demerara River Chiefdom and four of the couples children (Hatuey, Aderi, Tecumseh and Laliwa), were born on the Tribal land of Pakuri Village in Guyana.

As of 2019 the Eagle clan Lokono diaspora descendants of their last Hereditary Chief number 100 in Barbados, 100 in the UK, 80 in Cuba, 10 in the US, and 10 in Canada, with an estimated 1700 on Pakuri Lokono Territory in Guyana - where almost every tribal member alive today has some direct ancestor who was a Simon (and therefore a descendant of one of those 3 founding Simon brothers from the old Chiefdom).

Religion 
Traditional Lokono practice an animist spirituality, which is different from other religions, as one can join or leave, but one is born with a natural spirituality, an inherent knowledge of what are positive actions that should be done, and what are negative actions that should not be done. The greatest virtue taught to every traditional Lokono child is generosity and love for family, clan, and tribe.  

Historically, The Lokono people practiced animist shamanism, among the core beliefs is that every physical object has a spiritual carbon-copy of it, that is it exists in tangible form as well as simultaneously existing in an exact replica intangible spiritual form. The Shaman/Medicine Man (Semichichi) is not 'God's representative on Earth', the Shaman is the tribe's go-between from the physical world and the spirit world. The role of the Shaman is to answer questions or seek assistance for other tribal members, not to dictate ideas or opinions to others, each Lokono can communicate directly to the Creator Deity 'Adayahirli' which is often accorded the fatherly prefix 'Awa', as the Earth itself is spoken of in feminine gender.    

The Moon (Kaachi) and Sun (Hadali) are also spoken of in masculine genders, as they join the Earth mother (Onabo-oyo Koyaha) to create life in the physical world (plants cannot grow without being 'fertilized' by sunlight) and women's childbirths tend to cycle with the moon, the tides also are Moon (Kaachi) assisted.     

Lokono women (Hiaro) are considered to be spiritually superior to Lokono men this is why the certain work or activities in the tribe are considered beneath the dignity of women, such as grave-digging, hunting, and killing other living things, with fish being the sole exception, Lokono women and men can kill fish, but only the men can hunt and kill other animals, both genders can gather fruit and crops, though certain crops only women are supposed to plant the seeds, and only men may dig the holes in the ground that the women will then plant in. There are strict gender roles in traditional Lokono society.

The belief is that everything in the physical world can be said to have a spiritual component to it, but only humans have what can best be described as a third immortal conscious energy core or true self, that comes from the spirit world into the physical world, and can choose to temporarily or permanently remain in the spirit world (Ayonbanan) after leaving the physical world, the spirit world is seen as the 'real world' and the true place of origin for all life, or return to the physical world in a new and different human body, at a different time, to temporarily inhabit it and dwell among the living once again.

The use of Tobacco (Yuri) was central to this ancient belief system, however, Tobacco being a sacred plant was never traditionally smoked for recreational purposes, but only during prayers for the physical or spiritual healing of others. It is also taboo to mix Tobacco with any other substance to smoke while praying. So whereas a hand-rolled Tobacco leaf cigar would be sacred, a factory-made commercial cigarette would be sacrilege. 

Tobacco smoke is also used in blessing and purification ceremonies such as in Lokono girls 9 days long and Lokono boys 4-day long puberty rituals, as well as when the followers of traditional Lokono spirituality gather together for ritual occasions, the lit Tobacco cigar would be passed around the circle of Lokono persons in the circular traditional Bahi (house), as the circle is considered the most sacred shape, and each person would smoke it briefly as it is believed that there will be no lies between those smoking the Tobacco, or the transgressor would incur a personal misfortune for breaking this taboo.

Pakuri Village in Guyana (population 1700 Lokono) is the only Lokono community left that has a traditional Bahi dedicated solely for the purpose of traditional animist spirituality. It exists at Ayonto Hororo at the most southern permanently inhabited family homestead in the 240 square mile autonomous tribal territory, about 5% of the tribe still follows traditional animist spirituality, some in secret, others openly at Ayonto Hororo, due to the fact that it was driven underground by European Christian Missionaries who tried to eradicate traditional Lokono spiritual beliefs.

The traditional Lokono animist belief is that one cannot be trained to become a Shaman/Medicine Man (Semihichi), but a child who exhibits the necessary gifts and qualities of one destined to become a Shaman, can be guided and assisted in his learning by one who already is a Shaman. Women were not recorded as ever having been Shamans in Lokono culture, though knowledge of plant cures was not gender-specific.

The gifts a child destined to be a Shaman included being gifted from early childhood with accurate premonition dreams, visions, the ability to heal by touch and by auto-suggestion etc.

The Lokono of Suriname are the only ones who have preserved their ancient clan names in their official surnames, with Karowfodi, Biswana, Jubithana and Sabjo being prominent names.

References

Indigenous peoples in French Guiana
Indigenous peoples in Guyana
Indigenous peoples in Suriname
Indigenous peoples of the Guianas
Indigenous peoples in Trinidad and Tobago
Indigenous peoples in Venezuela